A liaison aircraft (also called an army cooperation aircraft) is a small, usually unarmed aircraft primarily used by military forces for artillery observation or transporting commanders and messages. The concept developed before World War II and included also battlefield reconnaissance, air ambulance, column control, light cargo delivery and similar duties. Able to operate from small, unimproved fields under primitive conditions, with STOL capabilities, most liaison aircraft were developed from, or were later used as general aviation aircraft. Both fixed-wing aircraft and helicopters can perform liaison duties.

Use by country

Bulgaria
 Kaproni Bulgarski KB-11 Fazan

Germany
Nazi period:
 Fieseler Fi 156 Storch
 Messerschmitt Bf 108 Taifun
 Focke-Wulf Fw 189 Uhu

Japan
Imperial period:
 Kokusai Ki-76 (Imperial Japanese Army Air Force, 1942–1945)
 Tachikawa Ki-36 (Imperial Japanese Army Air Force, 1938–1945)
Postwar period:
 LR-1 (Japan Ground Self-Defense Force, 1967–2016)
 LC-90 (Japan Maritime Self Defense Force, 1974–)

Poland
 Lublin R-XIII

Portugal

 Piper L-21 Super Cub (Portuguese Army, 1952–1957 and Portuguese Air Force, 1957–1976)
 Auster D.5/160  (Portuguese Air Force, 1961–1974)
 Dornier Do 27 (Portuguese Air Force, 1961–1979)
 Reims-Cessna FTB-337, (Portuguese Air Force, 1974–2007)

Soviet Union
 Polikarpov Po-2 Kukuruznik ("Crop Duster")

Sweden
 Piper PA-18-150 Super Cub as Flygplan 51, 1958–1974
 Dornier Do 27 as Flygplan 53, 1962–1991
 Scottish Aviation Bulldog as Flygplan 61C, 1972–1989

Switzerland
 Pilatus PC-6

United Kingdom
de Havilland Dominie
 Westland Lysander
 Taylorcraft Auster AOP

United States

 Vultee L-1 Vigilant
 Taylorcraft L-2 Grasshopper
 Aeronca L-3 and L-16  
 Piper L-4 and L-14  
 Stinson L-5 Sentinel
 Interstate L-6   
 Stinson L-9 
 North American / Ryan L-17 Navion
 Cessna O-1 Bird Dog

See also
Liaison pilot

References

External links 
www.als-cannonfield.com – The Alamo Liaison Squadron is a group dedicated to restoring and flying liaison aircraft.
Lbirds.com – Website with resources, information, and models of US WWII liaison aircraft
Lbirds – Forum open to discussion about liaison aircraft

Aircraft by type